Albrecht Willem "Pim" Lier (22 July 1918 – 9 April 2015) was a Dutch lawyer and jurist. He became well known in 1979 when he was revealed to be the illegitimate son of Prince Henry, the husband of Queen Wilhelmina. This made him a paternal half-brother of Queen Juliana and the half-uncle of Queen Beatrix.

He became a member of the Centre Party in 1984 and served as chairman until 1986 when he defected from the Centre Party to join the Centre Democrats.

On 18 December 1986 he shot his wife due to her terminal illness. He served four and a half years in prison for murder.

References

20th-century Dutch criminals
1918 births
2015 deaths
Centre Party (Netherlands) politicians
Dutch people convicted of murder
Party chairs of the Netherlands
Lawyers from The Hague
Criminals from The Hague